Jean Devergnies (born 10 August 1907, date of death unknown) was a Belgian boxer. He competed in the 1924 Summer Olympics. In 1924, Devergnies finished fourth in the featherweight class after losing the bronze medal bout to Pedro Quartucci.

References

External links
Jean Devergnies' profile at Sports Reference.com

1907 births
Year of death missing
Featherweight boxers
Olympic boxers of Belgium
Boxers at the 1924 Summer Olympics
Belgian male boxers